The Taipei Guest House is the historical building located at 1 Ketagalan Boulevard, Bo'ai Special Zone, Zhongzheng District, Taipei, Taiwan. It is owned by the Government of the Republic of China and used as a state guest house for receiving state guests or celebration activities.

History
Gotō Shinpei was responsible for maintaining its construction budget, and was recalled to Japan to meet with National Diet members after it was reported that funds set aside for the Taiwan Grand Shrine were being spent on the Taipei Guest House.

Until 1920, the Taipei Guest House was the residence of the Governor-General of Taiwan during the Japanese period, situated about 100 meters from the Office of the Governor-General of Taiwan (now the Presidential Building). Imperial members and heads of politics often visited here. Emperor Showa (Crown Prince Hirohito) also stayed here when visiting Taiwan. After Taiwan was handed over to the Republic of China, ROC Minister of Foreign Affairs George Yeh and Japanese Minister of Foreign Affairs Isao Kawada signed the Treaty of Taipei here in 1952.

In 1988, Taipei Guest House was designated by the government of Taiwan and administered by the Ministry of Foreign Affairs of Taiwan.

Architecture
The main architecture of the building is concave shaped, having a roof in Mansard style and high Roman pillars, mainly in a style of French Second Empire palace buildings. Inside the building there is a resplendent suspension light decorated with crystal, baroque gold leaves and flowers and gold foil; outside the building there is a modern Japanese curtilage garden. Taipei Guest House is the representative work of Taiwanese buildings under Japanese rule, also called the most graceful baroque residence house.

Taipei Guest House is open to the public on the first Sunday in even months from 4 June 2006.

Transportation
The building is accessible within walking distance south east of NTU Hospital Station of Taipei Metro.

See also
 Taipei Grand Hotel
 Zhongxing Guesthouse
 Taipei Futai Street Mansion

References

External links

Taipei Guest House 
Taipei Guest House (English)
Taipei Guest House at the Bureau of Cultural Heritage website 

1901 establishments in Taiwan
Baroque architecture in Taipei
Buildings and structures in Taipei
Houses completed in 1901
Houses in Taiwan
Palaces in Taiwan
Tourist attractions in Taipei
State guesthouses
National monuments of Taiwan
Neoclassical architecture in Taiwan